ABQ BioPark Zoo, located in Albuquerque, New Mexico, is a facility of the Albuquerque Biological Park. Founded in 1927, the  zoo was originally known as the Rio Grande Zoo. Sections of the zoo include an Africa exhibit area, an Australia exhibit area, the "Cat Walk" and herpetology area. An endangered species carousel was added in 2016. A narrow-gauge railroad connects the zoo to the other facilities of the Albuquerque Biological Park.

The Albuquerque Biological Park is an accredited member of the Association of Zoos and Aquariums (AZA).

Exhibits

Flamingo Crossing
A moated island located at the beginning of the zoo that holds the zoo's flock of Caribbean flamingos. The island is lush with bamboo vegetation.

Reptile House
The reptile house was remodeled in 2012. With the renovations the building houses mostly reptiles. The exhibit houses many species of snakes, tortoises and lizards. There are two large areas where the zoo's Komodo dragons are held. In a building located near the Reptile House the zoo's temporary home for a large adult saltwater crocodile and for slender-snouted crocodiles. On the outside of the Reptile House is the new Gator Swamp Exhibit, which is a large outdoor heated pool housing several adult American alligators. The reptile house received more renovations in 2017 to improve digital interpretive signage and interactive displays.

Five Texas horned lizards, born in August 2019 at the Zoo, are now on exhibit in the reptile building. The zoo has been breeding the species since 2017. The Texas horned lizard has disappeared from about half of its historic range due to habitat loss, human eradication of the ant populations that these lizards eat and displacement of native ant populations by invasive fire ants. To date, the zoo has successfully released about 70 young into the wild in Socorro County, New Mexico.

 Alligator snapping turtle
 American alligator
 Asian water monitor
 Black mamba
 Blue iguana
 Chinese alligator
 Forest cobra
 Gray-banded kingsnake
 Green anaconda
 Green tree python
 King cobra
 Komodo dragon
 Mangshan pit viper
 Mexican garter snake
 Ornate box turtle
 Plumed basilisk
 Quince monitor
 Saltwater crocodile
 Tentacled snake
 Texas horned lizard
 West African slender-snouted crocodile

Raptor Roost
Several large aviaries house Andean condors, golden eagles, great horned owls and Steller's sea eagles.

Mexican Wolf Exhibit
This exhibit holds the zoo's pack of Mexican wolves, the most endangered species of wolf in the United States. In June 2020, Mexican gray wolves Kawi and Ryder welcomed seven pups, this is the pair's second litter. The litter consists of five boys and two girls.

Inukshuk Bay
This large exhibit offers many views of the zoo's polar bears. One can see them through underwater viewing windows or walk to the top of the exhibit and watch the bears lounge, feed, and slide down the waterfall.

Catwalk
Grottos in this exhibit hold the zoo's big cats among other animals.

 African lion
 Binturong
 Bobcat
 Jaguar
 Malayan tiger
 Meerkat
 Mountain lion
 Ocelot
 Red kangaroo
 Serval
 Snow leopard

Amphibians: Life on a Limb
With the renovation of the Reptile House in 2012, the zoo opened up Amphibians: Life on a Limb, replacing the original Gator Swamp, where the zoo used to hold its juvenile alligators. The building houses several species of frog as well as other amphibians. The zoo also houses the only captive population of locust coquis, critically endangered frogs from Puerto Rico.

 African bullfrog
 Amazon milk frog
 Axolotl
 Barred tiger salamander
 Sonoran Desert toad
 Dyeing poison dart frog
 Green and black poison dart frog
 Panamanian golden frog

Asia
This exhibit contains several elephant yards and two barns for the zoo's Asian elephant herd. The exhibit now holds six Asian elephants in its herd, two males and four females. Rozana, also called Rozie, was born in the Rio Grande Zoo on November 8, 1992. On Sept. 2, 2009, Rozie gave birth to female elephant Daizy. Rozie gave birth to her second calf, Jazmine, on October 2, 2013. The virus, elephant endotheliotropic herpesvirus claimed Daizy's life on May 9, 2015. Rosie gave birth to her third calf, Thorn, in 2018.

Australia/Koala Creek
In September 2018, the zoo started making major progress in an expansion of the area with several different plans being put in motion. The zoo closed its seal pool, and the area will be repurposed in the expansion. New animals to be included in the expansion are dingos, little penguins, wallabies, and the return of koalas to the zoo. The Zoo will have and updated exhibits for most of its current animals and be a new home for the zoo's saltwater crocodile.

 Common wombat
 Koala
 Matschie's tree kangaroo
 Tasmanian devil

Africa
Six acres of land holding 17 separate exhibits and 23 species of mammals and birds..

 African wild dog
 Black-and-white ruffed lemur
 Cape vulture
 Capybara
 Chimpanzee
 Common warthog
 Hartmann's mountain zebra
 Hippopotamus
 Klipspringer
 Lappet-faced vulture
 Marabou stork
 Reticulated giraffe
 Saddle-billed stork
 Southeast African cheetah
 Southern white rhinoceros
 Spotted hyena
 Wattled crane

Ape Walk
This trail houses the zoo's apes, including siamangs, Sumatran orangutans and western lowland gorillas.

Birds of the Americas
Five species of birds from North and South America are mixed in this aviary: burrowing owls, Gambel's quails, greater roadrunners, hyacinth macaws and sun conures.

Penguin Chill
In July 2019, the highly anticipated penguin chill exhibit opened. The multi-million dollar exhibit was funded through a city tax bond. The exhibit features gentoo penguins, macaroni penguins, and king penguins, and is the first of its kind in the Southwest. The  building includes a  main tank, above-ground and underwater guest viewing areas, a large interactive educational area and an outdoor deck overlooking the Zoo's main park. The outdoor deck also includes restrooms and a snack bar as well. The exhibit begins with a themed main viewing deck will with a panoramic view to visitors. The main pool depths varying from  allows for plenty of space for penguin activity including special public feedings with keepers, swimming and enrichment. There is a glass floor area allows guests to see penguins swimming beneath their feet as your travel through the exhibit. The exhibit includes a natural day/night and seasonal lighting cycles help regulate the penguins' hormonal balancing and breeding. The Zoo had early hopes for baby penguins with two macaroni penguin eggs being discovered in 2020, however both eggs were discovered to be infertile.

Birds of the Islands
Opened in 2020, the zoo opened the Birds of the Islands exhibit on the location of the former parrot habitat. This exhibit is part of the Zoo's Americas Trail. Adjacent to the aviaries is an exhibit for Aldabra giant tortoises.

 Australian king parrot
 Bali myna
 Cuban amazon
 Major Mitchell's cockatoo
 Nicobar pigeon
 Princess parrot
 Rainbow lorikeet
 Red lory
 Socorro dove
 Superb starling
 Sulphur-crested cockatoo
 Wrinkled hornbill

Gallery

See also
Albuquerque Biological Park

Notes

External links

Zoos in New Mexico
Tourist attractions in Albuquerque, New Mexico
Parks in Bernalillo County, New Mexico
Zoos established in 1927
1927 establishments in New Mexico